The Columbia Road–Strathcona Road Historic District encompasses a collection of brick residential apartment houses on Columbia and Strathcona Roads in the Roxbury neighborhood of Boston, Massachusetts.  Arrayed on the southeast side of Columbia Road between Washington and Brinsley Streets are several multistory buildings  with well-preserved Colonial Revival features.  They were constructed in the first two decades of the 20th century, when the area was developed as a streetcar suburb.  These were built mainly by Jewish developers Saul E. Moffie and Samuel Levy to serve a growing Jewish population in the area.

The district was listed on the National Register of Historic Places in 2017.

See also
National Register of Historic Places listings in southern Boston, Massachusetts

References

Historic districts in Suffolk County, Massachusetts
Roxbury, Boston
National Register of Historic Places in Boston
Historic districts on the National Register of Historic Places in Massachusetts